The 2019–20 Guadeloupe Division of Honor was the 69th season of the Guadeloupe Division of Honor, the top division football competition in Guadeloupe. The season began on 24 August 2019 and was scheduled to end on 22 May 2020. The season prematurely ended on 8 March 2020 due to ongoing concerns surrounding the COVID-19 pandemic.

The season was declared abandon in July 2020, and Gosier were deemed the Guadeloupean champions.

League table 
4 points for a win, 2 points for a draw, 1 point for a defeat.
Table at abandonment:

</onlyinclude>

References

External links 
 2019–20 Guadeloupe Division of Honor at Soccerway
 2019–20 Guadeloupe Division of Honor at RSSSF

Guadeloupe Division of Honor
Guadeloupe
1
Guadeloupe